Jeremy Caniglia (born July 13, 1970) is an American figurative painter and illustrator, primarily in fantasy and horror genres. He has done book and magazine illustration, conceptual artwork, book and album covers, and comic books, and his work is in several important public collections including the Joslyn Art Museum and Iowa State University. His art has also been shown at the Society of Illustrators' Museum of Illustration.

Early life and education
Jeremy Caniglia was born July 13, 1970 in Omaha, Nebraska. He went to Creighton Preparatory School, where he was first introduced to art.

He studied traditional classical painting at Iowa State University (ISU), receiving a B.F.A. in Drawing, Painting and Printmaking in 1993. After graduation he studied at the Maryland Institute College of Art (MICA) in Baltimore, Maryland under well-known abstract expressionist painter, Grace Hartigan. He received his M.F.A. from MICA in 1995. In 2012, Caniglia began working at Creighton Preparatory Schools as a full time teaching staff and served as an adjunct professor for Creighton University.

In 2017, Caniglia apprenticed and studied with the figurative artist Odd Nerdrum.

Work 

In addition to Hartigan, whom he cites as "bringing new insight to his work," Caniglia was also influenced by the Old Masters including Leonardo da Vinci and Caravaggio.

Caniglia's art has been featured in the Washington Post and on CNN.  He has created book covers for well-known mainstream authors (Stephen King, Ray Bradbury, Peter Straub, Douglas Clegg, F. Paul Wilson) and he has done cover art and illustrations for a number of noted horror and fantasy writers including Ed Lee and Charlee Jacob.  His work has also appeared in Entertainment and horror magazines such as Rue Morgue magazine, Variety, Fangoria magazine, Flesh and Blood, and Cemetery Dance.

Caniglia has also created artwork for public institutions and churches. In 2009 he created a  religious icon of Saint Lucy for St. Francis Cabrini Church located in Little Italy (Omaha), in Nebraska.

In 2013 Lonely Road Books published a special limited edition of The Exorcist: The 40th Anniversary Revised Edition by William Peter Blatty.  The new, updated edition featured new and revised material that Blatty had left out of the original book. Lonely Road Books and William Peter Blatty brought in Caniglia to create all new cover and interior artwork for this special edition. Caniglia worked with Warner Home Video creating artwork for the film documentary on William Peter Blatty and the creation of The Exorcist directed by Laurent Bouzereau.

In 2013 Cemetery Dance published a new limited Edition of World War Z: An Oral History of the Zombie War by Max Brooks. Caniglia created all new artwork cover for this special release to coincide with the film release of World War Z. In the fall of 2013 he completed Easton Press' 170th anniversary edition of Charles Dickens' A Christmas Carol. In the fall of 2016 he completed the Easton Press' limited artist edition of O.Henry' short stories.

In 2017, Caniglia left Omaha to apprentice with the Norwegian figurative painter Odd Nerdrum. His print "Dreaming of Rembrandt" won an award in the Salmagundi Club's SCNY Monotype Exhibition in 2018. In 2020, David Weiss directed a documentary short film about Caniglia's life and work. This documentary was selected for Nebraska short films encore screening at the 2020 Omaha Film Festival.

Awards 
Caniglia was nominated first in 2003 for the International Horror Guild Award for best artist in dark fantasy and horror and then again in 2004, this time winning the prestigious award. In 2005 he was nominated for a World Fantasy Award for Best Artist in Fantasy. In 2015 Caniglia received the prestigious Design Achievement Award from the College of Design at Iowa State University.

Bibliography
This is a list of published illustration work.

Art books

 Spectrum issues 6, 10, 11, 12, and 13

Gothic Art Now: The Very Best In Contemporary Gothic Art, ILEX Publishing, 2008
Awaken: A New Spirit In Figurative Painting-Caniglia, Unimpressed Press Art books, 2009
I Before E Except after Death, Unimpressed Press Art books, 2011
Infected by Art: Volume Two, Hermes Press, 2014
Infected by Art: Volume Three, Hermes Press, 2015

Book, comic and album covers
 2002	
Breeder by Douglas Clegg
Darkoffspring edited by Brian Knight
Irish Witchcraft & Demonology by St. John d. Seymour
The Wicked by  Douglas Clegg
This Cape is Red Because I Have Been Bleeding by Tom Piccirilli
 2003	
Makak by Edward Lee
Necromancer by  Douglas Clegg
Rocksbreak/Scissors Cut by David J. Schow
Choir of Ill Children by Tom Piccirilli
Ever Nat by Edward Lee
F’in Lie Down Already''' by Tom PiccirilliHexes by Tom PiccirilliNeverland by  Douglas CleggRage by Steve GerlachThe Baby by Edward Lee
 2004	Boneland by Jeffrey ThomasDarklings by Ray GartonDead Man’s Hand by Tim LebbonThe Machinery of Night by  Douglas CleggThe New Neighbor by Ray GartonThe Turtle Boy by Kealan Patrick BurkeWaiting My Turn Under the Knife by Tom Piccirilli
 2005	Broken Angel by Brian KnightLike Death by Tim WaggonerLondon Revenant by Conrad WilliamsThe Abandonedby  Douglas CleggBerserk by Tim LebbonIn the Midnight Museum by Gary A. BraunbeckPieces of Hate by Tim LebbonThrust by Tom PiccirilliWormwood Nights by Charlee JacobZero by Michael McBrideMasters of Horror Soundtrack, Immortal Records
 2006 	She Loves Monsters by Simon ClarkTake the Long Way Home by Brian KeeneThe Halloween Man by Douglas CleggThe Rutting Season by Brian KeeneWild Things-Four Tales by  Douglas CleggMasters of Horror issues 1 and 2, IDW Publishing
 2007Red Spikes by Margo LanaganThe Everlasting by Tim LebbonThe Peabody-Ozymandias Traveling Circus & Oddity Emporium by F. Paul Wilson
 2008A Whisper of Southern Lights by Tim Lebbon
 2009The Locust by  Douglas CleggTender Morsels by Margo Lanagan
 2011Gutshot by Conrad Williams
 2013The Exorcist by William Peter BlattyWorld War Z: An Oral History of the Zombie War by Max BrooksA Christmas Carol by Charles DickensDinner with the Cannibal Sisters by  Douglas Clegg
 2014Submerged by  Thomas F. Monteleone
 2015Bad Dog by Tom PiccirilliBackshot by Tom PiccirilliBackshot by Ed Gorman
 2017Small World by Tabitha King
 2018Interview With The Vampire by Anne RiceCaretakers by Tabitha King

Book illustrations
 2003White and Other Tales of Ruin by Tim Lebbon
 2004The Devil’s Wine by Stephen King, Peter Straub, Ray BradburyThe Priest of Blood by Douglas CleggThe Crown Rose by Fiona AveryGreat Ghost Stories edited by Stephen Jones
 2005The Healer by Michael Blumlein, M.D.
 Various yearsThe Adversary Cycle by F. Paul Wilson

Magazines
CoversCemetery Dance issue 70 (2013)Nocturne issue 1 (2005)Cemetery Dance issues 37, 38 (2002)The Horror Express issue 2 (2004)
Interior artVariety Magazine (July 2005)Rue-Morgue Issues 47, 52Medium Magazine (June 2003)Flesh and Blood issue 13 (August 2003)Churn an Art Magazine issue 6 (2002)Cemetery Dance issue 39 (2002)Cthulhu Sex Magazine Issue 18 (2004)Redsine issue 9 (2003)Dark’s Art Parlour Issue #3 (1996)

Movies, DVDs, and TV (as conceptual artist)
 Masters of Horror Season 1 (Showtime) 2005 - 2006
 Masters of Horror Japanese DVD release (Kadokawa Pictures, USA) 2006Black Luck'' artist and actor in this action movie (2016)

Notes and references

External links
Caniglia’s official website
Caniglia in Spectrum Fantastic Art Annuals magazine
Cover art by Caniglia at Shocklines Press
Caniglia - Surreal Art Collective
Jeremy Caniglia at IMDb

American illustrators
American speculative fiction artists
20th-century American painters
American male painters
21st-century American painters
21st-century American male artists
Fantasy artists
1970 births
Living people
Maryland Institute College of Art alumni
Iowa State University alumni
20th-century American male artists
Students of Odd Nerdrum